The second cabinet of Ingvar Carlsson was the cabinet and Government of Sweden from 27 February 1990 to 4 October 1991.

The cabinet was a single-party minority government consisting the Social Democrats.  The cabinet was led by Prime Minister Ingvar Carlsson whose first cabinet had resigned in early February 1990 due an emergency package that had been voted down in Swedish Riksdag.  The need for an emergency package were still left when his second cabinet assumed office on 27 February 1990 and on 5 April 1990 his government made up an emergency package with the Liberal People's Party.

The cabinet resigned on 4 October 1991 following defeat in the 1991 general election. The cabinet was succeeded by the cabinet of Carl Bildt.

Ministers 

|}

External links
The Government and the Government Offices of Sweden

1990 establishments in Sweden
Cabinets of Sweden
Politics of Sweden
1991 disestablishments in Sweden
Cabinets established in 1990
Cabinets disestablished in 1991